Javier Osvaldo Sodero (born July 17, 1964 in Villa María (Córdoba), Argentina) is a former Argentine footballer who played for clubs of Argentina and Chile. He played as a goal keeper.

Teams
  Belgrano de Córdoba 1990-1992
  River Plate 1992-1995
  Huracán 1995-1996
  Provincial Osorno 1996
  Chacarita Juniors 1997-1999
  Deportivo Español 1999-2000

References
 Profile at BDFA 

1964 births
Living people
Argentine footballers
Argentine expatriate footballers
Club Atlético Huracán footballers
Club Atlético River Plate footballers
Chacarita Juniors footballers
Club Atlético Belgrano footballers
Provincial Osorno footballers
Chilean Primera División players
Argentine Primera División players
Expatriate footballers in Chile
Association football goalkeepers
People from Villa María
Sportspeople from Córdoba Province, Argentina